Raibha railway station (station code RAI) is a small railway station in Bichpuri, Agra district in the Indian state of Uttar Pradesh. it is 15 km from Agra Kheria Airport. Eleven express trains stop there.

Trains

 KSJ–AF PASSENGER
 BKI–BARELLY PASSENGER
 BE/BKI PASS
 IDH–BKI DMU
 MTJ–KSJ PASSENGER
 BKI–IDH SHUTTLE
 IDH–BTE SHUTTLE
 IDH–BRTP SHUTTLE
 BTE–IDH DMU
 IDH–BKI SHUTTLE
 BTE–IDH Shuttle

See also

 Northern Railway zone
 Kiraoli

References 

Railway stations in Agra district
Agra railway division